

The Sheffield Skeeter X-1 is an American single-seat lightweight homebuilt aircraft designed and built by Kenneth Sheffield of Littleton, Colorado. Designed for amateur construction only the prototype was built.

Design and development
Kenneth Sheffield set out to design a low-cost, easy-to-build aircraft. He included folding wings, a simple structure and powered it with a Volkswagen air-cooled engine. Design was started in 1966 and by April 1970 the Skeeter X-1, registered N117 had flown. The Skeeter X-1 is a parasol strut-braced monoplane with a welded steel fuselage. The fuselage is covered in wood and metal in the cockpit area but the aft-structure is uncovered and the pilot sits in an open cockpit. The two-spar wings fold for transportation, and they have ailerons, but no trim tabs or flaps. The wooden tail is strut and wire braced and fabric covered, and the landing gear is a fixed tailwheel type with a steerable tailwheel.

The Skeeter X-1 was registered by the Federal Aviation Administration in the experimental homebuilt category and the company planned to sell plans and finished propellers to customers but only the prototype appears to have been built.

Specifications

References

Notes

Bibliography

1970s United States civil utility aircraft
Homebuilt aircraft
Parasol-wing aircraft
Single-engined tractor aircraft
Aircraft first flown in 1970